Paul Martin Newby (born May 5, 1955) is an American judge, who was first elected to a seat on the North Carolina Supreme Court in 2004. He was elected Chief Justice in 2020.

Early life and education
Newby was born in Asheboro, North Carolina. He graduated from Ragsdale High School in Jamestown, North Carolina. He is an Eagle Scout and former Scoutmaster. A resident of Raleigh, North Carolina, Newby earned a bachelor's degree in Public Policy Studies from Duke University in 1977 and a Juris Doctor degree from the University of North Carolina at Chapel Hill in 1980.

Career
After four years in private practice in Kannapolis, a year as a counsel to a real estate developer, Vice President and General Counsel of Cannon Mills Realty and Development Corporation, Newby was appointed Assistant United States Attorney for the Eastern District of North Carolina in 1985, a post he held for almost twenty years.

Following the resignation of North Carolina Supreme Court Justice Robert F. Orr, Newby was one of eight candidates, four Republicans and four Democrats, who filed in a special election to fill the vacant seat; he won that race with 23% of the vote for an eight-year term on the court in the statewide judicial elections. In the officially non-partisan race, Newby was endorsed by the North Carolina Republican Party—the North Carolina Democratic Party refused to endorse any candidate in the race.

He is an adjunct professor at the Campbell University's Norman Adrian Wiggins School of Law, and the co-author of a book on the North Carolina Constitution.

In November 2012, he won re-election to a second eight-year term, defeating Sam Ervin, IV.

On November 3, 2020, Newby was elected North Carolina Supreme Court Chief Justice, for an eight-year term beginning Jan. 1, 2021. He was sworn in as the 30th Chief Justice of the North Carolina Supreme Court shortly after midnight.

Awards and associations
James Iredell Award, Phi Alpha Delta
Honorary Doctor of Laws, Southern Wesleyan University
Heroism Award, Boy Scouts of America
God and Service Award, Boy Scouts of America
Former Vice President, North Carolina Bar Association
Scoutmaster, Emeritus of Troop 11, Boy Scouts of America

Electoral history

Notes

References
"Watauga Democrat" article - Newby Seeks Second Term

External links
 The North Carolina Court System, Paul Martin Newby
 Paul Newby's Official Website
 Project Vote Smart, Associate Justice Paul M. Newby (NC)
 Star News Online, "State Supreme Court rules eyeballing not enough proof for drug evidence", June 21, 2010
 Katy's Conservative Corner, "Justice Paul Newby: Interpreting the Times", July 5, 2008

|-

1955 births
20th-century American lawyers
21st-century American lawyers
21st-century American judges
Assistant United States Attorneys
Chief Justices of the North Carolina Supreme Court
Justices of the North Carolina Supreme Court
Living people
North Carolina Republicans
People from Asheboro, North Carolina
Sanford School of Public Policy alumni
Southern Wesleyan University alumni
University of North Carolina School of Law alumni